The tenth season of the American sitcom The Big Bang Theory premiered on CBS on Monday, September 19, 2016. The series returned to its regular Thursday night time slot on October 27, 2016 after Thursday Night Football on CBS ended. The season concluded on May 11, 2017.

On March 12, 2014, The Big Bang Theory was renewed for an additional three years, extending it through the 2016–17 television season for a total of ten seasons.

Production
Like the previous two seasons, the first five episodes of the tenth season aired on a different night due to CBS acquiring the rights to Thursday Night Football games. In May 2016, CBS announced at its annual upfront presentation that the series would begin its tenth season on Mondays, before returning to the Thursday slot once the football games ended.

Filming for the tenth season began on August 16, 2016, according to posts on Instagram and Twitter by several of the cast members including Kaley Cuoco and Mayim Bialik.

Several castings for the tenth season were announced before the season began airing. Variety announced on July 22, 2016, that Katey Sagal and Jack McBrayer had been cast as Penny's mother and brother, respectively. Information about the characters was that Sagal would play Susan, who was described as stressed out and neurotic from a life with her troubled son. McBrayer would play Randall, a cheerful former drug dealer and ex-con. Entertainment Weekly reported on August 10, 2016, a week before filming began, that Dean Norris would have a multi-episode arc in the tenth season, and would be playing Colonel Williams, a tough officer from the Air Force Research Laboratory, who is interested in the men's quantum gyroscope for military applications. On November 9, 2016, TVLine reported that Christopher Lloyd had been cast as Theodore for the season's December 1 episode.

Cast

Main cast
 Johnny Galecki as Dr. Leonard Hofstadter
 Jim Parsons as Dr. Sheldon Cooper
 Kaley Cuoco as Penny
 Simon Helberg as Howard Wolowitz
 Kunal Nayyar as Dr. Rajesh "Raj" Koothrappali
 Mayim Bialik as Dr. Amy Farrah Fowler
 Melissa Rauch as Dr. Bernadette Rostenkowski-Wolowitz
 Kevin Sussman as Stuart Bloom

Recurring cast
 Christine Baranski as Dr. Beverly Hofstadter
 Laurie Metcalf as Mary Cooper
 Dean Norris as Colonel Richard Williams
 Brian George as Dr. V.M. Koothrappali
 Brian Posehn as Dr. "Bert" Bertram Kibbler
 John Ross Bowie as Dr. Barry Kripke
 Pamela Adlon as Halley Wolowitz (voice only)
 Brian Thomas Smith as Zack Johnson

Guest cast
 Judd Hirsch as Alfred Hofstadter
 Keith Carradine as Wyatt
 Katey Sagal as Susan
 Jack McBrayer as Randall
 Josh Zuckerman as Marty
 Laura Spencer as Emily Sweeney 
 Brandon Jones as The Flash
 Maria Canals-Barrera as Issabella Maria Concepcion
 Christopher Lloyd as Theodore
 Kate Micucci as Lucy
 Alessandra Torresani as Claire
 Katie Leclerc as Emily
 April Bowlby as Rebecca
 Riki Lindhome as Ramona Nowitzki

Episodes

Ratings

References

General references

External links

2016 American television seasons
2017 American television seasons
The Big Bang Theory seasons